Péter Majoros (born August 5, 1979 in Ózd, Hungary), known professionally as Majka, is a Hungarian rapper, songwriter and television host. He first became known in 2002 as a contestant of the reality show Való Világ on Hungarian TV channel RTL Klub. He continued his career as television show host and produced his first rap album together with the established Hungarian rapper Dopeman. He has since produced several more albums and mixtapes.

Personal life
He's married since 2021. His wife is Hungarian model Hajnalka Majoros (née Hornyák, also known as Dundika). They have 2 sons: Marián was born in 2011 and Olivér was born in 2016.

References

Hungarian rappers
Living people
1979 births
People from Ózd
21st-century Hungarian musicians